is a railway station in the town of Kawanehon, Haibara District, Shizuoka Prefecture, Japan, operated by the Ōigawa Railway.

Lines

Station layout
The station has one side platform serving a single track, connected to a small wooden station building. The station is unattended.

Adjacent stations

|-
!colspan=5|Ōigawa Railway

Station history
Sakidaira Station was one of the original stations of the Ōigawa Main Line, and was opened on December 1, 1931.

Passenger statistics
In fiscal 2017, the station was used by an average of 7 passengers daily (boarding passengers only).

Surrounding area
Japan National Route 362

See also
 List of Railway Stations in Japan

References

External links

 Ōigawa Railway home page

Stations of Ōigawa Railway
Railway stations in Shizuoka Prefecture
Railway stations in Japan opened in 1931
Kawanehon, Shizuoka